St. Columba’s Crozer (or the Cathach of Colum Cille) is a badly damaged and incomplete 8th or 9th century Irish Insular crozier fragment. It consists of a wooden core covered by sheet bronze tubes decorated with a bronze knope lined with silver and gilt. The wooden shaft measures four-feet and is elaborately decorated but incomplete: it was found broken in two and both its foot and crook are missing.

Built for St. Columba’s (also known as St. Colmcille (d. 597)), the fragment is held at the National Museum of Ireland, Kildare Street, Dublin, but is not usually on display.

Provenance
The staff originates from the ninth century, while a number of often poor and crude refurbishments date from the 12th century and later. It is one of the saints three well known relics, the others being his bell-shrine, and the well known 9th century Cathach of St. Columba which was built to contain a 6th century Insular psalter once though to have been written by Columba himself.

It is associated with Durrow Abbey in County Meath, which was founded by Columba in the 6th century. Following the dissolution of the abbey, it was kept by its hereditary keepers, the Mac Geoghegan family, until the mid-19th century. The staff was in the ownership of the Royal Irish Academy before 1850. Although considered to have once been one of the finest croziers, and a relic of one of Ireland's patron saints, it did not receive substantial scholarly examination until its inclusion in Column Burke's 1997 "Studies in the Cult of Saint Columba".

Description
The barrel shaped knope on the upper shaft is decorated with knotted interlace, and holds now empty settings that once contained studs, most likely of amber. Although this section is the earliest metalwork component, it was later filed down to accommodate both later embellishments and repair-work. Later  additions include the remnants of downwards farcing animal head on the crest positioned as a protruding wing from the main shaft.

References

Sources

 Bourke, Colm. Studies in the cult of Saint Columba. Dublin : Four Courts Press, 1997. 
 Moss, Rachel. Medieval c. 400—c. 1600: Art and Architecture of Ireland. London: Yale University Press, 2014. 
 Murray, Griffin. "Insular-type crosiers: their construction and characteristics". Making and Meaning in Insular Art: Proceedings of the Fifth International Conference on Insular Art, 2007

Collection of the National Museum of Ireland
Insular croziers